Albert Nshanovich Prus (born 15 May 1987) is a Russian former football player.

Club career
He made his Russian Football National League debut for FC Mashuk Pyatigorsk on 24 August 2006 in a game against FC Khimki.

References

External links
 

1987 births
Sportspeople from Sochi
Living people
Russian footballers
Association football forwards
Association football midfielders
Russian people of Abkhazian descent
FC Zhemchuzhina Sochi players
FC Chernomorets Novorossiysk players
FC Angusht Nazran players
FC Mashuk-KMV Pyatigorsk players